The Turnberry Band, also known as the Turnberry Bond, was a pact between Scottish and Anglo-Irish nobles signed on 20 September 1286 at Turnberry Castle, Ayrshire, Scotland. The agreement may have concerned a campaign in Ireland, and may have later formed the basis that bound the group around the claim of the Bruce family to the Scottish throne.

The Turnberry Alliance

English Translation
Bond by Patrick Earl of Dunbar, Patrick, John, and Alexander his sons, Walter Stewart, Earl of Menteith, Alexander and John his sons, Robert of Bruce, Lord of Annandale, and Robert of Bruce, Earl of Carrick, and Richard of Bruce his sons, James, Steward of Scotland, and John his brother, Enegus, son of Dovenald, and Alexander his lawful son, whereby they engage to adhere to Sir Richard de Burgh, Earl of Ulster, and Sir Thomas of Clare in all their affairs, and to stand faithfully by them and their accomplices against all their adversaries, saving their fidelity to the King of England, and also to him who should obtain the kingdom of Scotland by reason of relationship to Alexander King of Scotland last deceased. At Turnebyry in Carrick, on the eve of St. Matthew, 20th September 1286,....

Signatories
Patrick de Dunbar, Earl of Dunbar
Patrick de Dunbar, son of Patrick de Dunbar, Earl of Dunbar
John, son of Patrick de Dunbar, Earl of Dunbar
Alexander, son of Patrick de Dunbar, Earl of Dunbar
Walter Stewart, Earl of Menteith
Alexander Stewart, son of Walter Stewart, Earl of Menteith
John Stewart, son of Walter Stewart, Earl of Menteith
Robert de Brus, Lord of Annandale
Robert de Brus, Earl of Carrick, son of Robert de Brus, Lord of Annandale
Richard de Brus, son of Robert de Brus, Lord of Annandale
James Steward, High Steward of Scotland
John Stewart, son of James Stewart, High Steward of Scotland
Richard de Burgh, Earl of Ulster
Thomas de Clare, Lord of Thomond
Aonghas mac Domhnaill, Lord of Islay
Alexander, son of Aonghas mac Domhnaill, Lord of Islay

Notes

13th century in Scotland